Morten Bjerre (born February 13, 1972) is a retired Danish handball player. During his long career, he has played for league rivals Ajax København, as well as German Bundesliga sides SG Flensburg-Handewitt, THW Kiel and HSV Hamburg.

He won the German championship as well as the EHF Cup with THW Kiel.

For many years, Bjerre was an important player at the Danish national handball team, and is noted for almost 200 appearances.

External links
 Player info

1972 births
Living people
Danish male handball players
Viborg HK players
Handball players from Copenhagen